Water pinch analysis (WPA) originates from the concept of heat pinch analysis. WPA is a systematic technique for reducing water consumption and wastewater generation through integration of water-using activities or processes.  WPA was first introduced by Wang and Smith.  Since then, it has been widely used as a tool for water conservation in industrial process plants.  Water Pinch Analysis has recently been applied for urban/domestic buildings. It was extended in 1998 by Nick Hallale at the University of Cape Town, who developed it as a special case of mass exchange networks for capital cost targeting.

Techniques for setting targets for maximum water recovery capable of handling any type of water-using operation including mass-transfer-based and non-mass-transfer based systems include the source and sink composite curves (Nick Hallale (2002). A New Graphical Targeting Method for Water Minimisation. Advances in Environmental Research. 6(3): 377–390) and water cascade analysis (WCA).  The source and sink composite curves is a graphical tool for setting water recovery targets as well as for design of water recovery networks.

See also

 Cost-effective minimum water network
 Hydrogen pinch
 Reclaimed water
 Water management hierarchy

References

5. Hallale, Nick. (2002). A New Graphical Targeting Method for Water Minimisation. Advances in Environmental Research. 6(3): 377–390

Water resources management
Analysis